Rhizophysa is a genus of cnidarians belonging to the family Rhizophysidae.

The species of this genus are found in Malesia, Northern America.

Species:

Rhizophysa chamissonis 
Rhizophysa eysenhardtii 
Rhizophysa filiformis 
Rhizophysa uvaria

References

Rhizophysidae
Hydrozoan genera